The Wade House is a historic house in Ipswich, Massachusetts.  The -story gambrel-roofed central chimney house was built in 1792 by Francis Merrifield, Jr.  It was acquired in 1827 by Mary Wade, daughter of local Revolutionary War soldier Nathaniel Wade.  It has been in the Wade family since then.  The house originally had two rooms downstairs and two upstairs; the rear of the house was added in two stages.  A number of period details survive, including the central staircase and paneled doors.  Fragments of period wallpaper have also been preserved, and reproduction wallpaper has been used in one of the downstairs rooms.

The house was added to the National Register of Historic Places in 1980.

See also
National Register of Historic Places listings in Ipswich, Massachusetts
National Register of Historic Places listings in Essex County, Massachusetts

References

Houses completed in 1792
Houses in Ipswich, Massachusetts
National Register of Historic Places in Ipswich, Massachusetts
Houses on the National Register of Historic Places in Essex County, Massachusetts